Leroy Maluka (born 22 December 1985) is a South African footballer currently playing for Åbo IFK in the Finnish third tier Kakkonen.

He has previously played for Ikapa Sporting in the South African National First Division and for TPS in the Finnish premier division Veikkausliiga.

Career

Club career
Maluka came to Finland on holiday in the summer of 2010 and ended up on a trial at Kakkonen club Åbo IFK, a co-operation club of TPS. However from there, he was directly promoted to the TPS before he had time to play a match in Kakkonen.

Maluka moved to Tampere United in the summer of 2017. In June 2018, Tampere United announced that Maluka would take the place of the head coach of the representative team that played in Kakkonen after Mikko Mäkelä left the club.

For the 2019 season, Maluka returned to Åbo IFK where he also started coaching one of the clubs youth teams. In November 2019, he was also appointed first team player-assistant coach from the 2020 season.

Personal life
Leroy Maluka's brother is the artist Mustafa Maluka.

References

1985 births
Living people
South African soccer players
South African expatriate soccer players
Turun Palloseura footballers
FC Jazz players
Tampere United players
Veikkausliiga players
Sportspeople from Cape Town
Ikapa Sporting F.C. players
Åbo IFK players
FC YPA players
Association football midfielders
Expatriate footballers in Finland
South African expatriate sportspeople in Finland
South African soccer managers
Tampere United managers